In 1948, during President Juan Perón's first term of office, the seven British- and three French-owned railway companies then operating in Argentina, were purchased by the state. These companies, together with those that were already state-owned, where grouped, according to their track gauge and locality, into a total of six state-owned companies which later became divisions of the state-owned holding company Ferrocarriles Argentinos.

Background
In the latter half of the 19th century British and French-owned railway companies had played an important role in the economic development of Argentina. Between 1856 and 1914 the nation's railway network grew to become the largest in Latin America. The foreign investment provided by these companies had helped to transform Argentina from a relatively underdeveloped, rural country, with many isolated communities, into one which was becoming an increasingly prosperous agricultural producer and exporter.

The foreign-owned railway companies had developed under the protection of the Argentine's strong property rights of the time.

The rail networks of the various companies generally radiated inland from the major ports of Buenos Aires and Rosario and were primarily designed to speed the export of agricultural products from the provinces to European markets. The lack of interlinking between the many radial lines meant that the integration of the country’s interior was probably slower than it would have been had domestic needs been a priority.

During World War II it had not been possible to import railway equipment or materials which meant that there was an urgent need for track, locomotive and rolling stock renewal by the time nationalisation took place in 1948. Also railways were beginning to face stiff competition from road transport as improvements in the national road network were made.

By the time the railways were nationalised in 1948, during President Perón's first term in office, the growth in economic nationalism in the country had reached a point where, for many Argentines in search of self-determination, the foreign-owned railways had become symbols of the control of the country's economy by foreign powers.

Details  
Between 1936 and 1939 the once British-owned metre gauge Córdoba Central, Transandine and Central Chubut had already been nationalised. As from 1 March 1948 the remaining British-owned railway companies in Argentina also became the property of the government. These were the four broad gauge companies: BA Great Southern, Central Argentine, BA & Pacific and the BA Western; the standard gauge companies Entre Ríos and Argentine North Eastern; and the Buenos Aires Midland Railway the only metre gauge company.

British shareholders were compensated with the rescision of their US$ 500 million debt to the Central Bank of Argentina and US$100 million, cash. The cash figure proved controversial, as it had not previously been reported during the negotiations.  Pressed on the issue, President Perón explained that the premium was for "sentimental reasons."

Later in 1948 the three French-owned railway companies were also nationalised: the broad gauge Rosario & Puerto Belgrano and the metre gauge Compañía General de Buenos Aires and Provincial de Santa Fe.

After the nationalisation all the Argentine network was grouped into six railway divisions named after distinguished Argentine presidents and national heroes (such as José de San Martín, Manuel Belgrano, Domingo Sarmiento, Justo José de Urquiza, Bartolomé Mitre and Julio A. Roca) according to their track gauge and locality. Apart from former British and French companies, Argentine ones also became part of "Ferrocarriles Argentinos", the state-owned company specifically created after the nationalisation to manage the entire railway network.

The list of companies taken over by each division was as follows:

Notes:
 (1) The Central Northern had previously taken over North Argentine Railway in 1909.
 (2) The Central Argentine had previously acquired the BA Northern (1888), BA & Rosario (1902) and Santa Fe Western (1900) railway companies. 
 (3) The Entre Ríos Railway had acquired the Central Entre Ríos Railway in 1892.
 (4) The Argentine North Eastern had acquired the East Argentine in 1907.
 (5)The BAGSR had acquired Bahía Blanca & North Western and Buenos Aires & Ensenada railways before being built by the Argentine state.
 (6) The BAP had previously acquired the Villa María & Rufino (1900), Argentine Great Western Railway (1907), and Andean (1909) railways. (7) Originally an Argentine company, the BAWR had been purchased by British in 1890. Railway divisions network 
After the nationalisation, maps of the six railway divisions managed by state-owned Ferrocarriles Argentinos were as follows:

 Aftermath 

Argentines saw railway nationalisation as a major step towards the economic independence of their country which had for so long been under the influence of foreign capital. Nationalisation of the railways, the central bank, the telephone system and the docks were part of Perón's economic recovery scheme for postwar Argentina and had formed part of the first Five-Year Plan, announced in October 1946. Later in mass rallies he would refer to railway nationalisation as a victory over foreign imperialism.  At the time there was little local opposition, although later it became apparent that, far from stimulating the national economy, nationalisation of the railways together with other foreign companies, contributed to the economic crises that Argentina suffered from the 1950s onwards by adding substantially to national budget deficits (which the Central Bank was forced to finance largely by "printing money", leading to inflation). Argentine Railways, in particular, became the most deficit ridden State enterprise among the numerous ones nationalized by Perón, generating a million US dollars in losses daily by the 1960s, and two million by the 1980s.

See also
Ferrocarriles Argentinos
Rail transport in Argentina
Railway privatisation in Argentina

Bibliography
 British Steam on the Pampas by D.S. Purdom - Mechanical Engineering Publications Ltd, London (1977)
 British-Owned Railways in Argentina – Their Effect on Economic Nationalism, 1854-1948'' by Winthrop R. Wright - Latin American Monograph No. 34, Institute of Latin American Studies, Univ. of Texas Press, London (1974)

References 

N
R
Economic history of Argentina
R
R
Reform in Argentina